Scott George Murray (born 26 May 1974) is a Scottish former professional footballer who is now employed as the kitman at Bristol City.

Club career
Born in Fraserburgh, Aberdeenshire, and a product of the Scottish Highland Football League, Murray made his debut at his local Highland League club Fraserburgh aged just 16, where he played for the first-team for four years while working full-time in a local fish processing factory. Impressive on-field performances lead to interest from Aberdeen,  Rangers and Liverpool. After scoring in a trial game for Liverpool's reserves, Graeme Souness was shortly sacked as first-team manager and therefore any chance of signing a deal faded.

However, Aston Villa stepped in, and after scoring the quickest ever hat-trick in the Premiership reserve league - with his three strikes coming inside the first 12 minutes - Villa paid Fraserburgh £35,000 (at the time, the biggest fee received by a Highland League club for a transfer) for his services.

During his three years at Villa Park, Murray failed to make a big impression and made only four league appearances in that time.

He was signed by Bristol City from Aston Villa in December 1997 and was City's top scorer in the 2002–03 season. That season he was part of the side that won the 2003 Football League Trophy Final.

He later joined Reading for £650,000 in June 2003, and was a first team regular for Alan Pardew. In March 2004, he rejoined Bristol City. Murray's return boosted City's form but they lost in that season's playoff final to Brighton & Hove Albion. He was made club captain during Brian Tinnion's spell as manager.

In the 2006–07 season, City were drawn against Premier League side Middlesbrough in the FA Cup. Murray scored a chip against Australian number one Mark Schwarzer to earn the Robins a 2–2 draw at Ashton Gate, however they eventually lost the tie on penalties in the replay.

A key player in City's promotion push despite a stress fracture to his fourth metatarsal bone restricting him to 37 appearances, he signed a new one-year extension to his contract.

On 15 September, Murray became new Cheltenham Town manager Martin Allen's first signing on an emergency one-month loan, returning to Bristol City on 15 December. Murray was released by Bristol City in May 2009.

On 1 July, it was confirmed that he had signed a one-year contract with Yeovil Town becoming manager Terry Skiverton's third summer signing. He scored a brace in the 2–2 home draw with Brighton to rescue a point, with goals either side of half time bringing up his 100th and 101st career goals. He was released by Yeovil along with three other players on 13 May 2010.

Murray signed for part-time Football Conference side Bath City on a 12-month deal so that he could focus on his coaching role at Bristol City.

International
Murray has been capped by the Scotland B team after coming on as a substitute against Germany.

Honours
Individual
PFA Team of the Year: 2000–01 Second Division, 2001–02 Second Division, 2002–03 Second Division

References

● Playfair football annuals

External links
Scott Murray profile at bcfc.co.uk
Scott Murray profile at readingfc.co.uk

Virtual replay of Murray's goal against Middlesbrough

1974 births
Footballers from Aberdeen
Living people
Association football wingers
Scottish footballers
Scotland B international footballers
Aston Villa F.C. players
Bristol City F.C. players
Reading F.C. players
Cheltenham Town F.C. players
Yeovil Town F.C. players
Bath City F.C. players
Premier League players
English Football League players
National League (English football) players
Bristol City F.C. non-playing staff